Cabragh, sometimes written Cabra, is a townland in Fertiana civil parish in County Tipperary, Ireland.

References

Townlands of County Tipperary
Eliogarty